Josip Stanišić (born 2 April 2000) is a professional footballer who plays as a defender for Bundesliga club Bayern Munich. Born in Germany, Stanišić represents the Croatia national team internationally. Mainly a right-back, he can also play in any position in defence.

Club career

Early career 

Stanišić already played in the youth teams for the then second division TSV 1860 Munich and stayed there until the summer of 2015. As a 15-year-old, the change took place in front of the gates of the state capital in the U16s of the then sixth division SC Fürstenfeldbruck. With the club's younger B-Juniors, he was one of the top performers from the start and, as the second-best goalscorer in his team, contributed to the fact that the Bruckers were one of the two top teams in the B-Junior District League alongside 1. FC Garmisch-Partenkirchen. Already in May 2016, just turned 16, he was pulled up to the U17, in which he was also one of the top performers and with two goals in the remaining eight games of the season contributed to the U17 of SC Fürstenfeldbruck being promoted from the regional league to the state league, in the junior B division, the third highest division behind the Bundesliga and Bayernliga. The Croatian also had a regular place in the team in the regional league, which just missed the Bayern league at the end of the season. Stanisic was no longer there at this point, however, as FC Bayern Munich had noticed him in the meantime and signed him for their U17s in January 2017. Hardly in Munich, Stanišić suffered an ankle fracture in preparation for the second half of the season and was out for the rest of the season. So he missed winning the German B-Junior Championship.

In the summer of 2018, Stanišić played part of the season preparation with the professional team of Bayern Munich and was also used in two games in Klagenfurt and Philadelphia. However, Stanišić continued to play everyday life with the A-Juniors and was the new team captain there in his second season. In January he had to undergo a groin operation and was absent for several weeks. In that season, too, the team missed the final round of the German championship, with fourth place even quite clearly, and the two cup competitions again ended early.

He made his professional debut for Bayern Munich II in the 3. Liga on 26 July 2019, coming on as a substitute at half-time for Angelo Mayer in the home match against KFC Uerdingen, which finished as a 2–1 win.

Bayern Munich 
Stanišić made his Bundesliga debut for Bayern Munich in a 1–1 draw with Union Berlin on 10 April 2021, being named in the starting lineup as a left back. On 1 July 2021, Stanišić signed a professional contract with Bayern until 2023. After impressing Bayern coach Julian Nagelsmann during the pre-season, Stanišić remained with the senior team, despite the original plan to be sent on loan to Heidenheim. He was named in the starting lineup as a right back on 13 August 2021, the first day of Bundesliga, as Bayern drew 1–1 with Borussia Mönchengladbach. Four days later, he was named in the starting lineup once again, as Bayern defeated Borussia Dortmund 3–1 to win the DFL-Supercup. On 14 September, Stanišić made his Champions League debut in a 3–0 victory over Barcelona, coming off the bench for Niklas Süle in the 82nd minute. On 15 October 2021, Stanišić extended his contract with Bayern until 2025.

On 14 May 2022, Stanišić scored his first goal for Bayern in a 2–2 draw with Wolfsburg. On 12 November 2022, he extended his contract with Bayern until 2026.

International career 
Stanišić holds both German and Croatian citizenships. Despite previously playing for Germany U19, Stanišić was called up to the Croatia U21 team by Igor Bišćan on 23 August 2021 for the upcoming UEFA Under-21 Euro 2023 qualifiers against Azerbaijan and Finland. However, he failed to make his debut due to an injury. Soon after, on 20 September, Stanišić was called up to the senior Croatia team by Zlatko Dalić for the upcoming 2022 FIFA World Cup qualifiers against Cyprus and Slovakia. He made his debut on 8 October in a 3–0 victory over the former opponent, being named in the starting lineup.

On 9 November 2022, Stanišić was named in Dalić's 26-man squad for the 2022 FIFA World Cup. He received no playtime until the 2–1 third place play-off victory over Morocco on 17 December, when he replaced the injured Josip Juranović in the starting lineup.

Personal life 
Stanišić was born in Munich to Croat parents. His father Damir hails from Malino, and his mother Sandra hails from Oriovac.

Career statistics

Club

International

Honours 
Bayern Munich II
 3. Liga: 2019–20

Bayern Munich
 Bundesliga: 2020–21, 2021–22 
 DFL-Supercup: 2021, 2022

Croatia
 FIFA World Cup third place: 2022

References

External links
 Profile at the FC Bayern Munich website
 
 
 

2000 births
Living people
Footballers from Munich
Association football central defenders
Croatian footballers
Croatia under-21 international footballers
Croatia international footballers
German footballers
Germany youth international footballers
German people of Croatian descent
2022 FIFA World Cup players
FC Bayern Munich II players
FC Bayern Munich footballers
3. Liga players
Bundesliga players